Tomas Serrano (born April 30, 1982), known professionally as DJ IDeaL or IDeaL, is a Mexican American producer, musician, and DJ. He has gained notoriety in the EDM community, producing tracks in numerous electronic genres. He has worked extensively with other established EDM artists like J-Break, Tristan D, and Paul Oakenfold. He has also played numerous major EDM festivals, including the Ultra Music Festival, Life in Color, and the San Diego Pride Festival. DJ IDeaL considers San Diego, California his hometown.

Music career

Serrano's interest in dance music was spurred by a family member when he was only 8 years old. He began DJing at 15 for a senior project in high school. From that point, he began performing at house parties and underground events. He also attended UC Santa Cruz where he became active in the rave scene. By the early 2000s, Serrano was working in rave and nightclub scenes at 18+ & 21+ nightclubs in both Tijuana and San Diego. In 2006, he was a promotions manager for Giant while also managing the Belo Nightclub in San Diego.

Jägermeister sponsored DJ IDeaL in the late 2000s, making him their first house music artist. He has also been the resident DJ at numerous nightclubs, including most recently at Avalon Hollywood in California and Guacara Taina in Santo Domingo, Dominican Republic. DJ IDeaL first teamed up with J-Break in 2011 on a remix for Eddie Amador's "Morning After." He went on to produce original mixes with Eddie Amador and J-Break, including "I Need You" in 2013. In 2014, he released an original mix with Tristan D entitled "Miami" which reached #14 in the Beatport Trance charts. Throughout his career, IDeaL has performed alongside notable EDM artists like Paul Oakenfold, Tiësto, and The Crystal Method in locations across the United States, and the Dominican Republic, Greece. He has also performed at the Playboy Mansion numerous times.

Discography

References

External links
 Official Website
 Profile on Beatport

Hispanic and Latino American musicians
Living people
1982 births
Mexican emigrants to the United States
American DJs
American musicians of Mexican descent